The 2014 Diamand Tour was a women's bicycle race in Nijlen, Belgium. It was rated by the UCI as a 1.2 category race.

Results

References

2014 in Belgian sport
Cycle races in Belgium
Women's road bicycle races
2014 in road cycling